Vadim Rață (born 5 May 1993) is a Moldovan professional footballer who plays as a midfielder for Liga I club Voluntari and the Moldova national team.

Club career

FCSB
On 12 August 2022, Rață joined Romanian Liga I club FCSB.

Return to Voluntari
On 6 September 2022, just after 3 games played for FCSB, Rață returned to Voluntari, agreeing to a three-year deal.

International career
Rață made his debut for the Moldova national team on 14 February 2015, being replaced by Alexandru Onică at half time in a 1–2 friendly loss to Romania B in Aksu, Kazakhstan.

Career statistics

Club

International

Scores and results list Moldova's goal tally first.

Honours
Sheriff Tiraspol
Divizia Națională: 2011–12, 2012–13

Zaria Bălți
Moldovan Cup runner-up: 2016–17
Moldovan Super Cup runner-up: 2016

Milsami Orhei
Moldovan Cup: 2017–18

Chindia Târgoviște
Liga II: 2018–19

Voluntari
Cupa României runner-up: 2021–22

References

External links
 
 

1993 births
Living people
Footballers from Chișinău
Moldovan people of Romanian descent
Moldovan footballers
Moldova youth international footballers
Moldova under-21 international footballers
Moldova international footballers
Association football midfielders
Moldovan Super Liga players
FC Sheriff Tiraspol players
FC Tiraspol players
CSF Bălți players
Speranța Nisporeni players
FC Milsami Orhei players
Liga I players
Liga II players
AFC Chindia Târgoviște players
FC Voluntari players
FC Steaua București players
Moldovan expatriate footballers
Moldovan expatriate sportspeople in Romania
Expatriate footballers in Romania